The Prospect Park School District is a community public school district that serves students in pre-kindergarten through eighth grade from Prospect Park, in Passaic County, New Jersey, United States. Its only school, Prospect Park Elementary School, has expanded multiple times to accommodate its growing student body, including a $1.5 million preschool expansion completed in 2012.

As of the 2019–20 school year, the district, comprised of one school, had an enrollment of 878 students and 64.0 classroom teachers (on an FTE basis), for a student–teacher ratio of 13.7:1.

The district is classified by the New Jersey Department of Education as being in District Factor Group "B", the second lowest of eight groupings. District Factor Groups organize districts statewide to allow comparison by common socioeconomic characteristics of the local districts. From lowest socioeconomic status to highest, the categories are A, B, CD, DE, FG, GH, I and J.

For ninth through twelfth grades, public school students attend Manchester Regional High School, which also serves students from Haledon and North Haledon. The school is located in Haledon. The district participates in the Interdistrict Public School Choice Program, which allows non-resident students to attend the district's schools without cost to their parents, with tuition paid by the state. Available slots are announced annually by grade. As of the 2019–20 school year, the high school had an enrollment of 796 students and 64.4 classroom teachers (on an FTE basis), for a student–teacher ratio of 12.4:1.

As of the 2014-15 school year, Prospect Park's share of funding for the Manchester had more than doubled in the previous decade, with property taxes for the regional district rising nearly $700 on the average home in the previous two years after a 2013 change by the Commissioner of the New Jersey Department of Education to the district's funding formula that allocated costs with half based on enrollment and half based on valuation, a formula that benefited North Haledon. Haledon and Prospect Park had argued that property valuation should be the basis for assessing district taxes, while North Haledon, with the largest property valuation, had argued that funding should be based exclusively on enrollment.

School
Prospect Park Elementary School had an enrollment of 859 students as of the 2019–20 school year. The school population was made up of Hispanic (54%), White (22%), Black (22%), and Other (2%).
Dr. Tyeshia Reels, Principal/Superintendent 

Mrs. Catherine D’Arrigo, Vice Principal/Director of Special Services

Dr. Erin Stinson-Gaudio, Director of Curriculum and Instruction

Administration
Core members of the district's administration are:
Dr. Tyeshia A. Reels, Superintendent
Melissa Simmons, Interim School Business Administrator / Board Secretary

Board of education
The district's board of education, comprised of seven members, sets policy and oversees the fiscal and educational operation of the district through its administration. As a Type II school district, the board's trustees are elected directly by voters to serve three-year terms of office on a staggered basis, with either two or three seats up for election each year held (since 2012) as part of the November general election. The board appoints a superintendent to oversee the district's day-to-day operations and a business administrator to supervise the business functions of the district.

References

External links
Prospect Park Elementary School 

School Data for the Prospect Park Elementary School, National Center for Education Statistics
Manchester Regional High School

Prospect Park, New Jersey
New Jersey District Factor Group B
School districts in Passaic County, New Jersey